Aleksandar Anđelić (16 October 1940 – 24 March 2021) was a Serbian ice hockey coach.  He coached extensively in the Netherlands and Germany, and used to coach the Serbian youth team - while working from Toronto.

Born in Bačka Palanka, Andjelic played for Partizan Belgrade in Belgrade before playing in the Netherlands for clubs 's-Hertogenbosch Red Eagles in 1967–68, Nijmegen Tigers in 1968-69 .  He played over 40 times for Yugoslavia.

He played for Yugoslavia at the 1964 Winter Olympics.

He coached with a number of clubs: Nijmegen, Heerenveen Flyers, Rotterdam Panda's, Tigers Amsterdam, and IJHC Den Bosch in the Netherlands; Schwenninger Wild Wings, Essen Moskitoes, Deggendorf, and Grefrather EC in Germany; and EHC Chur and Rapperswil-Jona in Switzerland.  In the 2019–2020 season, he coached the Zoetermeer Panters from the Dutch top division and the Turkish National Team.

On March 24, 2021, it was announced in Dutch media Andjelic died in a hospital in Belgrade, after a week of being kept in a coma. He had also tested positive for COVID-19.

References

External links
 
 Profile of Andjelic at nijmegen-legends.com

1940 births
2021 deaths
Deaths from the COVID-19 pandemic in Serbia
People from Bačka Palanka
's-Hertogenbosch Red Eagles players
Ice hockey players at the 1964 Winter Olympics
Nijmegen Tigers players
Olympic ice hockey players of Yugoslavia
Yugoslav ice hockey forwards
Serbian ice hockey forwards
Serbian expatriate sportspeople in Canada
Yugoslav expatriate ice hockey people
Yugoslav ice hockey coaches
Yugoslav expatriate sportspeople in the Netherlands
Serbian expatriate sportspeople in the Netherlands
Expatriate ice hockey players in the Netherlands
Serbian expatriate ice hockey people
Ice hockey coaches
Yugoslav expatriate sportspeople in Switzerland
Serbia and Montenegro expatriate sportspeople in Switzerland
Serbia and Montenegro expatriate sportspeople in Germany
Serbian expatriate sportspeople in Germany
Serbian expatriate sportspeople in Turkey
Serbia and Montenegro expatriate sportspeople in the Netherlands
Serbian expatriate sportspeople in Switzerland